Cetin may refer to:

 Çetin, Turkish name
 Cetin Castle, Croatia
 CETIN, a Czech telecoms company
 CETIN - Kazakh cost estimation in software engineering